Alyona is a Russian female given name derived from the Ancient Greek name , Helenē (dialectal variant: , Helena). It can also be the short form of Yelena. Its colloquial forms are Alena, and Olena (Олёна). It can also be transliterated as "Aliona." Other variants include Helena and Helen. Notable people include:

Alyona Alekhina, Russian-American snowboarder 
Alyona Lanskaya (born 1985), Belarusian singer
Aljona Savchenko (born 1984), Ukrainian-born German pair skater 
Alyona Minkovski (born 1986), Russian-American television correspondent
Alyona Alyona (born 1991), Ukrainian rapper
Alyona Shchennikova (born 2001), American gymnast of Russian heritage
Alena Kostornaia (born 2003), Russian figure skater

Russian feminine given names